William Arthur Flint (12 March 1890 - 5 February 1955) was an English footballer who played in the Football League for Notts County. Flint was also a first-class cricketer active 1919–29 who played for Nottinghamshire.

References

External links
Billy Flint profile at thisisnottingham.co.uk

1890 births
1955 deaths
People from Underwood, Nottinghamshire
Footballers from Nottinghamshire
English footballers
Association football wing halves
Association football forwards
Eastwood Rangers F.C. players
Notts County F.C. players
English Football League players
English cricketers
Nottinghamshire cricketers